Robert Kenneth "Bobby" Hunt (born August 15, 1940 in Lanett, Alabama) is a former American Professional Football defensive back who played in the American Football League (AFL). He played as a quarterback and defensive back collegiately at Auburn University.  He was drafted by the Dallas Texans of the AFL in 1962 and went on to play in the AFL for the Texans, Kansas City Chiefs, and the Cincinnati Bengals between 1962 and 1969.   He was first-team All-AFL his rookie year with the Texans. Hunt had ten interceptions in 1966 and during his nine-year career he had forty-two, returning them for 755 yards and a touchdown. He was second-team All-AFL in 1964 & 1966, and was selected to play in the AFL All-Star game in 1964. He was an AFL Champion with the Chiefs in 1962 and in 1967 (1966 AFL season), when he played for them in the first AFL-NFL World Championship game.  After his playing career he was an assistant coach with the Buffalo Bills for 2 seasons. Hunt is a member of the Alabama Sports Hall of Fame class of 2015.

See also
 Other American Football League Players

External links
 Hunt's citation in the American Football League Hall of Fame

Living people
1940 births
People from Lanett, Alabama
Players of American football from Alabama
American football safeties
Auburn Tigers football players
Dallas Texans (AFL) players
Kansas City Chiefs players
Cincinnati Bengals players
American Football League All-Star players
Buffalo Bills coaches
American Football League players